Asthamayam is a 1978 Indian Malayalam-language film, directed by P. Chandrakumar and produced by Madhu. The film stars Madhu, Jayan, Sharada and Jayabharathi. The film has musical score by Shyam.

Cast
Madhu 
Jayan as Venu.
Sharada 
Jayabharathi 
Thikkurissy Sukumaran Nair 
Sankaradi 
Bahadoor 
Mala Aravindan 
Kunchan

Soundtrack
The music was composed by Shyam and the lyrics were written by Sreekumaran Thampi and Sathyan Anthikkad.

References

External links
 

1978 films
1970s Malayalam-language films
Films directed by P. Chandrakumar